Gareth Lee Graham (born 6 December 1978) is a Northern Irish retired footballer who played as a midfielder or right back. He began his career in the Football League at Crystal Palace, before transferring to Brentford in 1999. Upon his release from Brentford, Graham embarked on a nomadic career in non-League football. He represented Northern Ireland U21 at international level. He was known by the nickname "Ginge".

Club career

Crystal Palace 
Graham began his career in his native Northern Ireland with Dungoyne Boys and Glentoran, before moving to England to join the youth system at Crystal Palace. He reached the final of the FA Youth Cup and won the Southern Junior Floodlit Cup with the youth team during the 1996–97 season and also made his debut for the reserve team. Graham signed his first professional contract in March 1997 and broke into the reserve team during the early part of the 1997–98 season.

A broken leg suffered in a Surrey Senior Cup match for the reserve team in late 1997 hampered Graham's progress. Graham returned to match play with the reserve team early in the 1998–99 season and to regain fitness, Graham and teammate Andy Martin joined Southern League Premier Division club Merthyr Tydfil on loan December 1998. He made his Crystal Palace debut away to Watford on 24 April 1999, as a substitute for Steven Thomson after 77 minutes of the 2–1 defeat. Graham failed to receive a call into the first team during the early months of the 1999–00 season and departed the club in October 1999.

Brentford 
Graham joined Second Division club Brentford on loan on 28 September 1999 and the move was made permanent on 6 October. Following a loan at Southern League Premier Division club Crawley Town, Graham finally made his Brentford debut on 18 December, as a late substitute for Martin Rowlands in a 1–0 defeat to Wigan Athletic. Graham broke into the team on a regular basis in March 2000 and finished the 1999–00 season with 13 appearances.

Graham was out of favour under new manager Ray Lewington during the 2000–01 season, but a buildup of games in hand (due to bad weather and Brentford's run to the 2001 Football League Trophy Final) saw the squad stretched during the second half of the season and Graham was a regular unused substitute. He made his only appearance of the season as a late substitute for Jay Tabb in a 2–2 draw with Luton Town on 3 May 2001. Graham was released at the end of the 2000–01 season, after making just 14 appearances during his time with the Bees.

Non-League football 
Aside from a spell in Iceland with Úrvalsdeild club ÍBV in 2002, Graham played in non-League football between 2001 and his retirement in 2014. He played the majority of his football in the Isthmian and Combined Counties leagues and his most notable spell was with AFC Wimbledon, with whom he won consecutive promotions during the 2003–04 and 2004–05 seasons. He had two spells with Croydon Athletic and four with Whyteleafe and captained both clubs. His last club was Lingfield, for whom he made the final appearance of his career early in the 2014–15 season.

International career 
Graham won five caps for Northern Ireland at U21 level. He made his debut in a 1–1 1999 International Triangular Tournament draw with Scotland on 4 June 1999. He made three appearances during Northern Ireland's unsuccessful 2000 European U21 Championship qualifying campaign and the last of his caps came in a 2–1 defeat to Finland on 8 October 1999.

Personal life 
Graham was born in Belfast, Northern Ireland. He lives in Croydon and works in film, media and entertainment insurance. He is a Tottenham Hotspur supporter.

Career statistics

Honours 
AFC Wimbledon
Isthmian League First Division: 2004–05
Combined Counties League Premier Division: 2003–04

References

External links

1978 births
Living people
Association footballers from Belfast
Brentford F.C. players
Whyteleafe F.C. players
Íþróttabandalag Vestmannaeyja players
Crystal Palace F.C. players
Lingfield F.C. players
AFC Croydon Athletic players
AFC Wimbledon players
Croydon Athletic F.C. players
Cray Wanderers F.C. players
Kingstonian F.C. players
Merstham F.C. players
Croydon F.C. players
Chipstead F.C. players
Chertsey Town F.C. players
Leatherhead F.C. players
Merthyr Tydfil F.C. players
Crawley Town F.C. players
Woking F.C. players
Margate F.C. players
English Football League players
Association footballers from Northern Ireland
Northern Ireland under-21 international footballers
Northern Ireland youth international footballers
Southern Football League players
National League (English football) players
Úrvalsdeild karla (football) players
Isthmian League players
Association football midfielders
Association football fullbacks